Joe Chambers (born June 25, 1942) is an American jazz drummer, pianist, vibraphonist and composer. He attended the Philadelphia Conservatory for one year.  In the 1960s and 1970s, Chambers gigged with many high-profile artists such as Eric Dolphy, Charles Mingus, Wayne Shorter, and Chick Corea.  During this period, his compositions were featured on some of the albums on which he appeared, such as those with Freddie Hubbard and Bobby Hutcherson. He has released fifteen albums as a bandleader and been a member of several incarnations of Max Roach's M'Boom percussion ensemble.

He has also taught, including at the New School for Jazz and Contemporary Music in New York City, where he leads the Outlaw Band. In 2008, he was hired to be the Thomas S. Kenan Distinguished Professor of Jazz in the Department of Music at the University of North Carolina Wilmington.

Discography

As leader 
 1973: The Almoravid (Muse, 1974)
 1976: New World (Finite, 1976)
 1977: Double Exposure (Muse, 1978)
 1979: Joe Chambers and Friends: Chamber Music (Baystate, 1979)
 1979: Joe Chambers Plays Piano (Denon, 1979)
 1981: New York Concerto featuring Yoshiaki Masuo (Baystate, 1981)
 1991: Phantom of the City (Candid, 1992) – live
 1995: Isla Verde with Trio Dejaiz  (Paddle Wheel, 1995)
 1998: Mirrors (Blue Note, 1999) 
 2002: Urban Grooves (Eighty-Eight's, 2002)  
 2005: The Outlaw (Savant, 2006)
 2009: Horace to Max (Savant, 2010)
 2012: Joe Chambers Moving Pictures Orchestra (Savant, 2012)
 2015: Landscapes (Savant, 2016)
 2020: Samba de Maracatu (Blue Note, 2021)
 2022: Dance Kobina (Blue Note, 2023)

As sideman 

With Franck Amsallem
 Summer Times (Sunnyside, 2003)

With Chet Baker
Peace (Enja, 1982)With Donald Byrd Mustang! (Blue Note, 1967) – recorded in 1964-66
 Fancy Free (Blue Note, 1970) – recorded in 1969With Chick Corea Tones for Joan's Bones (Atlantic, 1968) – recorded in 1966With Stanley Cowell Brilliant Circles (Freedom, 1972) – recorded in 1969
 Back to the Beautiful (Concord, 1989)With Miles Davis The Complete In a Silent Way Sessions (Columbia, 2001) – recorded in 1968-69With Art Farmer Something Tasty (Baystate, 1979)With Don Friedman Metamorphosis (Prestige, 1966)With Jimmy Giuffre New York Concerts (1965; Elemental Music, 2014)With Joe Henderson Mode for Joe (Blue Note, 1966)
 Big Band (Verve, 1997) – recorded in 1992-96With Andrew Hill Andrew!!! (Blue Note, 1968) – recorded in 1964
 Compulsion!!!!! (Blue Note, 1967) – recorded in 1965
 One For One (Blue Note, 1975) – recorded in 1965-70With Freddie Hubbard Breaking Point (Blue Note, 1964)With Bobby Hutcherson Dialogue (Blue Note, 1965)
 Components (Blue Note, 1966) – recorded in 1965
 Happenings  (Blue Note, 1967) – recorded in 1966
 Total Eclipse (Blue Note, 1969) – recorded in 1968
 Now!, (Blue Note, 1970) – recorded in 1969
 Oblique (Blue Note, 1979) – recorded in 1967
 Spiral (Blue Note, 1979) – recorded in 1965-68
 Patterns (Blue Note, 1980) – recorded in 1968
 Medina, (Blue Note, 1980) – recorded in 1969
 Blow Up, (JMY, 1969 released 1990)With Robin Kenyatta Nomusa (Muse, 1975)With Lee Konitz Figure & Spirit (Progressive, 1977) – recorded in 1976With Hubert Laws Wild Flower (Atlantic, 1972)With Ray Mantilla Mantilla (Inner City, 1978)With M'Boom Re: Percussion (Strata-East, 1973)
 M'Boom (Columbia, 1979)
 Collage (Soul Note, 1984)
 To the Max! (Enja, 1992) – recorded in 1990–91With Charles Mingus Charles Mingus and Friends in Concert (Columbia, 1972)
 Something Like a Bird (Atlantic, 1978)
 Me, Myself an Eye (Atlantic, 1978)With Grachan Moncur IIIShadows, (Denon, 1977)With Karl RatzerIn Search Of The Ghost, (Vanguard, 1978)With Sam RiversContours, (Blue Note, 1967) – recorded in 1965With Jeremy SteigLend Me Your Ears, (CMP Records, 1978)With Woody Shaw In the Beginning (Muse, 1983) – recorded in 1965
 The Iron Men with Anthony Braxton (Muse, 1980) – recorded in 1977With Archie Shepp Fire Music (Impulse!, 1965)
 On This Night (Impulse!, 1965)
 New Thing at Newport (Impulse!, 1966) – recorded in 1965. also features a set by John Coltrane.
 For Losers (Impulse!, 1969)
 Kwanza (Impulse!, 1969)
On Green Dolphin Street (Denon, 1978)With Wayne Shorter Et Cetera (Blue Note, 1980) – recorded in 1965
 The All Seeing Eye (Blue Note, 1966) – recorded in 1965
 Adam's Apple (Blue Note, 1967) – recorded in 1966
 Schizophrenia (Blue Note, 1969) – recorded in 1967With Heiner Stadler Brains On Fire Vol. 1 (Labor, 1973) – recorded in 1966-71With John Stubblefield Prelude (Storyville, 1978)With Ed Summerlin Sum of the Parts (Ictus, 1998)With The Super Jazz Trio The Super Jazz Trio (Baystate, 1978)
 Something Tasty (Baystate, 1979)
 The Standard (Baystate, 1980)With Hidefumi Toki City (Baystate, 1978)With Charles Tolliver Paper Man (Freedom, 1975) – recorded in 1968With McCoy Tyner Tender Moments (Blue Note, 1968) – recorded in 1967With Miroslav Vitous Infinite Search, (Embryo, 1970) – recorded in 1969With Tyrone Washington Natural Essence (Blue Note, 1968) – recorded in 1967With Joe Zawinul' Zawinul'' (Atlantic, 1971) – recorded in 1970

References

External links
Interview with Brian L. Knight
Blue Note Label Artist's page

1942 births
Living people
American jazz drummers
American jazz pianists
American male pianists
Mainstream jazz drummers
Mainstream jazz pianists
Musicians from Philadelphia
Post-bop drummers
Post-bop pianists
Muse Records artists
Candid Records artists
Blue Note Records artists
University of the Arts (Philadelphia) alumni
American session musicians
20th-century American drummers
American male drummers
20th-century American pianists
Jazz musicians from Pennsylvania
21st-century American pianists
20th-century American male musicians
21st-century American male musicians
American male jazz musicians
M'Boom members
The New Jazz Composers Octet members
American jazz vibraphonists